}}
The Ernst & Young Tower (EYTC) is a skyscraper in downtown Cleveland, Ohio that stands on the east bank of the Flats completed in 2013. It is an example of post-modern glass curtain and steel studded construction. The major tenant is the London-based accounting firm of Ernst & Young which moved from its offices in the iconic Huntington Bank Building at East 9th Street and Euclid Avenue (Cleveland) to its new namesake tower in 2013. Ernst & Ernst was established in 1903 in Cleveland. Young & Co. was founded in Chicago in 1906. These two giant accounting firms merged in 1989 to create Ernst & Young, which still dominates the field.

Tenants
The building is also the Cleveland office of these law firms: Cleveland-based Tucker Ellis, Zashin & Rich, and Columbus, Ohio-based Porter Wright Morris Arthur. In addition to these major tenants the tower is home to the Cleveland-based  metal chemical company OM Group, and is the Cleveland office of San Francisco-based financial corporation Wells Fargo The EYTC is attached to an Aloft Hotels-branded hotel. The hotel has a 150 guest rooms and the W XYZ bar.

List of tenants
(as of August 2018)

 Ernst & Young (Top six floors)
 Porter Wright Morris Arthur (Cleveland office HQ)
 Tucker Ellis (Headquarters)
 Zashin & Rich (Cleveland office HQ)
 OM Group (World Headquarters)
 Wells Fargo (regional Cleveland office)
 McKinsey & Company (Cleveland HQ)
 Gilbane Building Co. (Cleveland Construction HQ)
 Winter | Trimacco Co., LPA (Cleveland office)

See also
 List of tallest buildings in Cleveland
 The Flats

References

Buildings and structures in Cleveland
Skyscraper office buildings in Cleveland
Gensler buildings
Office buildings completed in 2013